The 1971 CFL Draft composed of nine rounds where 70 Canadian football players that were chosen exclusively from eligible Canadian universities. The Saskatchewan Roughriders, despite being Western Conference finalists, had the first overall selection through a trade with the last place Winnipeg Blue Bombers.

1st round

1. Saskatchewan Roughriders  Brian Donnelly  DB  Simon Fraser

2. Ottawa Rough Riders  Bob Eccles  LB  Carleton

3. British Columbia Lions                    Archie McCord  T  Simon Fraser

4. Edmonton Eskimos  Mel Smith  E  Alberta

5. Winnipeg Blue Bombers                     Peter Ribbins  DB Ottawa

6. Saskatchewan Roughriders                 Bill Manchuk  DB  Alberta

7. Winnipeg Blue Bombers                     Bob Kraemer  QB  Manitoba

8. Edmonton Eskimos                          Cam Innes  C  Queen's

9. Winnipeg Blue Bombers                    John Gauthier  T  Ottawa

2nd round

10. Calgary Stampeders                       Joe Petrone  PK  Calgary

11. Hamilton Tiger-Cats                      Bob Foulsewych  FB Guelph

12. British Columbia Lions                   Michel Levelle  F  Ottawa

13. Edmonton Eskimos                         Pat Lett  T  Guelph

14. Toronto Argonauts  Bob Hamilton  E Waterloo Lutheran

15. Saskatchewan Roughriders  John Steele  LB  Simon Fraser

16. Hamilton Tiger-Cats                      Walter Sehr  HB Toronto

17. Calgary Stampeders                       Dan Dulmage  T McGill

18. Calgary Stampeders  Greg Gibson  DB  Calgary

3rd round

19. Winnipeg Blue Bombers                    Clay McEvoy  TB  Simon Fraser

20. Ottawa Rough Riders                       Bob Padfield  T  Waterloo

21. British Columbia Lions                   Henry Lodewyks  F  Manitoba

22. Edmonton Eskimos                         Gene Wolkowski  E  Guelph

23. Toronto Argonauts                        Ron Faulkner  T  Queen's

24. Saskatchewan Roughriders                 Jim Lazaruk  C  Alberta

25. Hamilton Tiger-Cats                      Paul Zarek  Safety  McMaster

26. Calgary Stampeders  James Bond  DT  Simon Fraser

27. Calgary Stampeders                       Dwayne Dudgeon  E  Loyola

4th round

28. Winnipeg Blue Bombers                    Walt McKee  PK  Manitoba

29. Ottawa Rough Riders                      Art Lord  DB  Saskatchewan

30. British Columbia Lions  John Chapman  E  Toronto

31. Edmonton Eskimos  Dick Flynn  G  New Brunswick

32. Toronto Argonauts  Bill Morrison  DE  Guelph

33. Saskatchewan Roughriders  Bob Clarke  DE  Alberta

34. Hamilton Tiger-Cats                      Chuck Wakefield  E  Waterloo

35. Calgary Stampeders                       Ross Cote  G  Calgary

36. Montreal Alouettes                   Tony Proudfoot  LB  New Brunswick

5th round

37. Winnipeg Blue Bombers                    Steve Howell  E  Windsor

38. Ottawa Rough Riders                       Steve Derbyshire  T  Western Ontario

39. British Columbia Lions                   Mike Begg  WR  Simon Fraser

40. Edmonton Eskimos                         Don Tallas  DB  Alberta

41. Toronto Argonauts                        Allan Dresser  G  Windsor

42. Saskatchewan Roughriders                 Fred Pazarena  LB  Simon Fraser

43. Hamilton Tiger-Cats                      Jim Dimitroff  FB  Saint Mary's

44. Calgary Stampeders                       Bryden Murray  C  Bishop's

45. Montreal Alouettes  Jack Galbraith  T  Manitoba

6th round

46. Winnipeg Blue Bombers                    Paul Paddon  DB  Ottawa

47. Ottawa Rough Riders  Steve Hoffman  DE  Windsor

48. British Columbia Lions                   Ron Fowler  TB  British Columbia

49. Edmonton Eskimos  Bob Rowe  LB  Calgary

50. Toronto Argonauts  Bill Hartley  G  St. Francis Xavier

51. Winnipeg Blue Bombers  Roy Parker  F  Manitoba

52. Hamilton Tiger-Cats                      Rodger Hunter  DB  Guelph

53. Calgary Stampeders                       Bruce Macrae  HB  Western Ontario

54. Montreal Alouettes  Bob Keating  T  Manitoba

7th round

55. Winnipeg Blue Bombers                    Ben Labovich  E  Carleton

56. Ottawa Rough Riders  George Hill  LB  Western Ontario

57. British Columbia Lions                   John Farlinger  DB  Calgary

58. Edmonton Eskimos                         Jack Buchan  E  Toronto

59. Winnipeg Blue Bombers                    Art Rochette  QB  Queen's

60. Hamilton Tiger-Cats                      Mike Chevers  E  Waterloo

61. Calgary Stampeders                       Don Hickey  E  Alberta

62. Montreal Alouettes                       Jack Schneider  LB  Bishop's

8th round

63. Winnipeg Blue Bombers                    Ian Jukes  G  British Columbia

64. Ottawa Rough Riders                       Marshall Caplan  LB  McMaster

65. British Columbia Lions                   Bryan Ansley  DT  Simon Fraser

66. Hamilton Tiger-Cats  Wayne Fox  F  Waterloo

67. Montreal Alouettes                       Peter Merrill  QB  New Brunswick

9th round

68. Winnipeg Blue Bombers                    Dennis Hrychiko  HB  Manitoba

69. British Columbia Lions                   Gerald Fraser  G  Manitoba

70. Montreal Alouettes                       Art Strothart  DB  New Brunswick

References
Canadian Draft

Canadian College Draft
Cfl Draft, 1971